Phyllis Winifred McQuaid (born March 6, 1928) is an American politician in the state of Minnesota. She served in the Minnesota Senate from 1983 to 1990 as an Independent Republican member, representing district 44.  McQuaid previously served as mayor of St. Louis Park, Minnesota from 1978 to 1982 and on the St. Louis Park School Board.

References

1928 births
Living people
Women mayors of places in Minnesota
Women state legislators in Minnesota
Republican Party members of the Minnesota House of Representatives
School board members in Minnesota
21st-century American women